Scoturius is a genus of South American jumping spiders that was first described by Eugène Louis Simon in 1901.  it contains only two species, found only in Argentina, Paraguay, and Bolivia: S. dipterioides and S. tigris.

References

Salticidae genera
Invertebrates of Paraguay
Salticidae
Spiders of South America